Robert Abi Nader is a Lebanese fashion designer.

Career
Nader went to Paris, the capital of the haute couture and fashion world, to pursue his studies in fashion design. He was accepted into the prestigious Chambre Syndicale de la Haute Couture, where he became one of the first successful Lebanese fashion designers in France. Nader was chosen by designer Yves Saint Laurent to train in his fashion house.

Nader dresses a number of princesses, first ladies, movie stars, and beauty queens. He has been called the "king of Middle Eastern haute couture".

Nader was granted an honorable diploma from the Chambre Syndicale de la Haute Couture. He was the first Lebanese designer to exhibit his collection during the Paris Haute Couture season.

References

External links

Official site

Lebanese fashion designers
Living people
1975 births